Emperor Qianshao of Han (193 BC – 15 June 184 BC), personal name said to be Liu Gong, was the third emperor of the Han dynasty in China.  He was a son, likely the oldest son, of Emperor Hui, likely by a concubine—although there is some controversy on the subject—and adopted by Emperor Hui's wife, Empress Zhang Yan.  At the instigation of his grandmother, Empress Lü, Empress Zhang had Emperor Qianshao's mother put to death.

Very little about Emperor Qianshao's life and personality is known.  There are only a few major important events in his life that are documented (which does not even include the year of his birth).  In 188 BC, his father Emperor Hui died, and he, who had been previously made crown prince, succeeded to the throne.  However, his grandmother, now Grand Empress Dowager Lü, publicly presided over all government affairs.

Sometime in or before 184 BC, Emperor Qianshao discovered that he was not in fact now-Empress Dowager Zhang's son and that his mother had been put to death.  He made the mistake of remarking that when he grew up, those who killed his mother would pay for this.  Grand Empress Dowager Lü, once she heard of this, had him secretly imprisoned within the palace and publicly announced that he was severely ill and unable to receive anyone.  After some time, she told the officials that he continued to be ill and incapable of governing, and that he had also suffered a psychosis.  She proposed that he be deposed and replaced.  The officials complied with her wishes, and he was deposed and put to death. He was succeeded by his brother Liu Yi on 15 June 184 BCE; Liu Yi's name was then changed to Liu Hong.

Emperor Qianshao, considered to be a mere puppet of Grand Empress Dowager Lü, is often omitted from the official list of emperors of the Han Dynasty.

Ancestry

See also
 Family tree of the Han Dynasty

References

 Records of the Grand Historian, vol. 9.
 Book of Han, vol. 3.
 Zizhi Tongjian, vols. 12, 13.

184 BC deaths
Western Han dynasty emperors
2nd-century BC Chinese monarchs
Year of birth unknown
Murdered Chinese emperors
Murdered Chinese children